Prolophota is a genus of moths of the family Erebidae. The genus was erected by George Hampson in 1896.

Taxonomy
The genus has previously been classified in the subfamily Calpinae of the family Noctuidae.

Species
 Prolophota pallida Turner, 1936
 Prolophota trigonifera Hampson, 1896

References

Boletobiinae
Noctuoidea genera